Jacques Baumer (born Jacques Henri Nusbaumer; 12 April 1885 - 20 June 1951), was a French theatre director and comedian.

Filmography 
 1932:  by Georges Lacombe
 1933: Étienne by Jean Tarride
 1936:  by Max Glass and Marco de Gastyne – (M. Legrand)
 1936: L'Homme sans cœur by Léo Joannon - (Jeanton)
 1936: La Belle Équipe by Julien Duvivier - (M. Jubette)
 1937: Southern Mail by Pierre Billon – (Le procureur)
 1937:  by Marcel L'Herbier - (commandant Bovy)
 1937: Gribouille by Marc Allégret - (M. Morinier)
 1937: Mollenard by Robert Siodmak
 1937: Désiré by Sacha Guitry - (Félix)
 1937:  by Jacques de Baroncelli - (Di-Larco)
 1937: Un déjeuner de soleil by  - (M. Fleury-Vallée)
 1937:  by  - (inspector Finois)
 1938:  by Jean Choux - (doctor Cézambre)
 1938: La Piste du sud by Pierre Billon - (Gomez)
 1938: Café de Paris by Yves Mirande and Georges Lacombe - (Le commissaire de police)
 1938: Légions d'honneur by Maurice Gleize - 
 1938: Rasputin (1938 film) by Marcel L'Herbier - (Prokoff)
 1938:  by Jean Stelli
 1938:  by J. Rosenkranz - (M. Hénard)
 1939: Le Jour Se Lève by Marcel Carné
 1939: Entente cordiale by Marcel L'Herbier - (Clemenceau)
 1939: Behind the Facade by Yves Mirande and Georges Lacombe - 
 1940: Paris-New York by Yves Mirande - 
 1942: The Strangers in the House (film) by Henri Decoin - (Gérard Rogissart)
 1942:  by Robert Péguy - (Henri Lebourg)
 1942:  by Jean Dréville - (Grugh)
 1942:  by Maurice Gleize - (the doctor)
 1942: The Benefactor by Henri Decoin - (director of P.J)
 1942: Mahlia la métisse by Walter Kapps
 1942: Mademoiselle Béatrice by Max de Vaucorbeil - (Maître Bergas)
 1943: The Count of Monte Cristo (1943 film) by Robert Vernay - (Noirtier), Edmond Dantès during the first period
 1943: Le Colonel Chabert by René Le Hénaff - (M. Delbecq)
 1943: L'Éternel Retour by Jean Delannoy
 1943:  by René Le Hénaff - (M. Vorage)
 1944: Les Caves du Majestic by Richard Pottier - (Arthur Donge)
 1947: Par la fenêtre by Gilles Grangier - (M. Miroud, the commanditaire)
 1948: Dilemma of Two Angels by Maurice Tourneur - (Jérôme)
 1948:  by Sacha Guitry - (M. Maillard)
 1949: Millionaires for One Day by André Hunebelle - (president of the court)
 1949: 'Night Round  by François Campaux - (judge)
 1949:  by Raymond Leboursier - (Le commissaire Hyacinthe)
 1949: Manèges by Yves Allégret - (Louis)
 1950:  by Marc-Gilbert Sauvajon - (Maître Dubuisson)
 1951: Darling Caroline by Richard Pottier -

Theatre

Comedian 
 1924: La Galerie des glaces by Henri Bernstein, Théâtre du Gymnase
 1927:  by Édouard Bourdet, directed by Victor Boucher, Théâtre de la Michodière
 1929: Durand, bijoutier by Léopold Marchand, Théâtre Saint-Georges
 1930: Étienne by Jacques Deval, Théâtre Saint-Georges
 1933: Karma by Jeffrey Dell, Théâtre de l'Œuvre
 1934: Les Temps difficiles by Édouard Bourdet, Théâtre de la Michodière
 1936: Europe by Maurice Rostand, Théâtre Pigalle
 1936: La vie est si courte by Léopold Marchand, Théâtre Pigalle
 1938: Duo de , directed by Jean Wall, Théâtre Saint-Georges
 1941: La Machine à écrire by Jean Cocteau, directed by Jean Cocteau, Théâtre Hébertot
 1943: Clotilde du Mesnil by Henry Becque, directed by Alice Cocéa, Théâtre des Ambassadeurs
 1943:  by Georges Feydeau, directed by Alice Cocéa, Théâtre des Ambassadeurs
 1943: À la gloire d'Antoine by Sacha Guitry, Théâtre Antoine
 1947: Nuits noires by John Steinbeck, directed by Henri Rollan, Théâtre Saint-Georges
 1944: Mademoiselle Antoinette by Jean Guitton, Théâtre de l'Apollo
 1950: Harvey by Mary Chase, mise-en-scène Marcel Achard, Théâtre Antoine

Theatre director 
 1929: L'Amoureuse Aventure by Paul Armont and Marcel Gerbidon, Théâtre Édouard VII
 1930: Mistigri by Marcel Achard, Théâtre Daunou
 1930: Langrevin père et fils by Tristan Bernard, Théâtre des Nouveautés
 1931: Le Cyclone de Somerset Maugham, Théâtre des Ambassadeurs
 1932:  by Jacques Deval, Théâtre Saint-Georges
 1932: Trois et une by Denys Amiel, Théâtre Saint-Georges
 1933: Lundi 8 heures by George S. Kaufman and Edna Ferber, Théâtre des Ambassadeurs
 1934: Le Discours des prix, play with 3 acts and 4 scenes by Jean Sarment, Théâtre Saint-Georges, 27 September in Paris
 1934: Liberté provisoire by Michel Duran, Théâtre Saint-Georges
 1936: Ma liberté by Denys Amiel, Théâtre Saint-Georges
 1942: Les Inséparables by Germaine Lefrancq, Théâtre de Paris
 1942: Les J3 ou la nouvelle école by Roger Ferdinand, Théâtre des Bouffes-Parisiens
 1946: Ce soir je suis garçon ! by Yves Mirande & André Mouëzy-Éon, Théâtre Antoine
 1946: Les Derniers Seigneurs by Roger Ferdinand, Théâtre Édouard VII
 1946: La Nuit du 16 janvier by Ayn Rand, Théâtre de l'Apollo
 1946: Étienne by Jacques Deval, 
 1948: Ils ont vingt ans by Roger Ferdinand, Théâtre Daunou
 1954: Les J3 de Roger Ferdinand, Théâtre de l'Ambigu-Comique

Bibliography 
 Raymond Chirat, Olivier Barrot, Les Excentriques du cinéma français : 1929-1958, Henri Veyrier, Paris, 1983 
 Yvan Foucart, Dictionnaire des comédiens français disparus, Éditions cinéma, Mormoiron, 2008, 1185 p.

External links 
 Jacques baumer on data.bnf.fr
 

1885 births
Theatre directors from Paris
1951 deaths
Male actors from Paris
Burials at Père Lachaise Cemetery